Robert Harte may refer to:
Robert Sheldon Harte (1915–1940), American Communist
Robert Harte (New Zealand actor) (fl. 1995–2009), New Zealand actor

See also
Robert Hart (disambiguation)